Saint-André-des-Eaux is a commune in the Côtes-d'Armor department of Brittany in northwestern France.

Population

Inhabitants of Saint-André-des-Eaux are called andréanais in French.

See also
Communes of the Côtes-d'Armor department

References

External links

Communes of Côtes-d'Armor